Crambus bellinii is a moth in the family Crambidae. It was described by Graziano Bassi in 2014. It is found in Ethiopia.

References

Crambini
Moths described in 2014
Moths of Sub-Saharan Africa
Lepidoptera of Ethiopia